"Get on the Good Foot" is a funk song performed by James Brown. It was released in 1972 as a two-part single that charted #1 R&B and #18 Pop. It also appeared on an album of the same name released that year. Partly due to the unwillingness of Brown's record labels to certify sales of his previous hits, "Get on the Good Foot" was his first gold record. Billboard ranked it as the No. 99 song for 1972.

Performances of "Get on the Good Foot" appear on the albums Hot on the One, Live in New York, Live at Chastain Park and Live at the Apollo 1995

Personnel
 James Brown - lead vocal, organ

with The J.B.'s:
 Russell Crimes - trumpet
 Ike Oakley - trumpet
 Fred Wesley - trombone
 Jimmy Parker - alto saxophone
 St. Clair Pinckney - tenor saxophone
 Hearlon "Cheese" Martin - guitar
 Bobby Roach - guitar
 Fred Thomas - bass
 John "Jabo" Starks - drums

Certifications

References

External links
 [ Song Review] from Allmusic
 Songs which sample "Get on the Good Foot" 

1972 singles
James Brown songs
Songs written by James Brown
Songs written by Fred Wesley
Polydor Records singles
1972 songs